WDUQ-LP is a Classical and Opera formatted broadcast radio station licensed to Benwood, West Virginia, serving McMechen and Benwood in West Virginia and Bellaire and Shadyside in Ohio.  WDUQ-LP is owned and operated by Kol Ami Havurah.

History

In June 2001, Kol Ami Havurah applied to the U.S. Federal Communications Commission (FCC) for a construction permit for a new broadcast radio station. The FCC granted this permit on July 31, 2002, with a scheduled expiration date of January 1, 2004. The new station was assigned call sign "WVJW-LP" on August 8, 2002. After construction, modification, and testing were completed in January 2003, the station was granted its broadcast license on February 5, 2004.

On May 21, 2008, lightning struck near the WVJW-LP transmitter facility causing a power surge which damaged the station's broadcast transmitter. Falling silent for technical reasons, the station petitioned the FCC for special temporary authority to remain off the air for financial reasons while the transmitter was assessed and funding for repair or replacement was gathered. The station returned to the air that summer.

The station was assigned the call sign "WDUQ-LP" by the FCC on January 1, 2012. The WDUQ call sign was previously used on a Pittsburgh radio station, now WESA, from December 1949 until September 2011. The WDUQ callsign was chosen by owners Kol Ami Havurah because the letters "DUQ" is a form of the Hebrew root דוח or "report". Kol Ami Havurah is a Jewish religious organization and uses Hebrew.

References

External links
 Beautiful Music 99-1 WDUQ Online
 

2003 establishments in West Virginia
Classical music radio stations in the United States
Radio stations established in 2003
DUQ-LP
DUQ-LP
Marshall County, West Virginia